Anata is a Palestinian town in the Jerusalem Governorate in the central West Bank, located four kilometers northeast of Jerusalem's Old City. According to the Palestinian Central Bureau of Statistics, 'Anata had a population of 9,600 in 2006. Its total land area is 30,603 dunams, of which over half now lies within the Israeli Jerusalem municipality and 1,654 is Palestinian built-up area. Since 1967, 'Anata has been occupied by Israel.  Together with Shu'afat refugee camp, the village is almost surrounded by the separation barrier, cutting it off from Jerusalem and surrounding villages except for a checkpoint in the west and a road in the north-east that gives access to the rest of the West Bank.

History
'Anata is a village on an ancient site, old stones have been reused in village homes, and cisterns dug into rock have been found, together with caves and ancient agricultural terraces.
The prophet Jeremiah was born there from the priest family of ‘Anata.

Bronze and Iron Ages
Edward Robinson identified 'Anata with the biblical town of Anathoth, birthplace of Jeremiah, in his Biblical Researches in Palestine. This identification is accepted by Finkelstein. Findings from 'Anata include pottery from the Iron Age II and the Hellenistic period. 

The toponym may be linked to the Canaanite goddess Anat.

Byzantine period
There are ruins of a Byzantine-era church in the town, proving that it was inhabited prior to the Muslim conquest of Palestine by the Rashidun Caliphate in the 7th century.

Ayyubid period
Ahead of the 1187 Muslim siege of Jerusalem against the Crusaders, Saladin, the Ayyubid general and sultan, situated his administration in 'Anata before he proceeded towards Jerusalem.

Ottoman period
The village was incorporated into the Ottoman Empire in 1516 with all of Palestine, and in 1596 'Anata appeared in Ottoman tax registers as being in the Nahiya of Quds of the Liwa of Quds. It had a population of 10 Muslim households. The villagers   paid a fixed tax rate of 40 % on agricultural products, including wheat, barley, summer crops, olive trees, fruit trees, goats and/or bee hives; a total of 9,300 Akçe. All of the revenue went to a Waqf.

The village was destroyed by Ibrahim Pasha in 1834 following a pro-Ottoman Arab revolt against Egyptian rule. In 1838 Anata was noted as a Muslim village, located north of Jerusalem.

When W. M. Thomson visited it in the 1850s, he described it as a "small, half-ruined hamlet, but it was once much larger, and appears to have had a wall around it, a few fragments of which are still to be seen." 

In 1863 Victor Guérin visited the village and described it as being a small, situated on a hill, and with 200 inhabitants. Socin found from an official Ottoman village list from about 1870 that 'Anata had 25 houses and a population of 70, though the population count included men, only. According to information received by
Clermont-Ganneau in 1874, the village was settled by Arab families from Khirbet 'Almit, a mile to the northeast.

In 1883, the PEF's Survey of Western Palestine described it as a "village of moderate size, the houses of stone; it stands on a ridge commanding a fine view to the north and east. ...There are a few olives round the village, and a well on the west and another on the south-east."

In 1896 the population of 'Anata was estimated to be about 180 persons.

British Mandate period
In the 1922 census of Palestine conducted by the British Mandate authorities, 'Anata had a population of 285, all Muslim,  increasing in the 1931 census to 438, still all Muslim, in 98 houses.

In the 1945 statistics  'Anata had a population of 540 Muslims,   with 18,496 dunams of land, according to an official land and population survey. Of this, 353 dunams were plantations and irrigable land, 2,645 used for cereals, while 35 dunams were built-up land.

Jordanian period (1948-1967)
In the wake of the 1948 Arab–Israeli War, 'Anata came under Jordanian rule.  

The Jordanian census of 1961 found 852 inhabitants in 'Anata.

Israeli and PA period (1967-current)

After the Six-Day War in 1967, 'Anata has been under Israeli occupation. The population in the 1967 census conducted by the Israeli authorities was 1,260, 121 of whom originated from the Israeli territory. At the time of the conquest Anata was one of the most expansive towns in the West Bank, extending from Jerusalem to the wadis near Jericho. Most of its land was confiscated to create the Israeli military base at Anatot, 4 Israeli settlements and several illegal Israeli outposts.

After the 1995 accords, about 3.8% of the land (or 918 dunams) is classified as being Area B, while the remaining 96.2 % (or 23,108 dunams) is Area C. Most of the lands of 'Anata have been confiscated by Israel. Of the 1877 dunums which remain in residents' hands, after creation of the Palestinian National Authority in 1994, 957 dunums became part of Area B, 220 dunums part of Area C, and 700 dunums have been declared a closed military zone by the Israeli authorities. The Dahyat as-Salam neighbourhood has been annexed by Israel as part of the Jerusalem municipality. The village boundaries are far-reaching and stretch from 'Anata itself to just east of the Israeli settlement of Alon. Most of the land is undeveloped open space with little or no vegetation.

According to ARIJ, Israel has confiscated land from 'Anata for the construction of 4 Israeli settlements:
 328 dunams for Alon,
 717 dunams for Nofei Prat, 
 820 dunams for Kfar Adumim, 
 783 dunams for Almon.

Ayn Fara, the Palestinian village’s natural pool and spring, was absorbed into the Israeli Ein Prat Nature Reserve.

Main families
The families are Shiha, Abd al-Latif, Ibrahim, Alayan, Hilwa, Salama, Hamdan, Abu Haniya Musah and al-Kiswani. The latter family fled to 'Anata during the 1948 Arab-Israeli War.

Sanctuaries

'Anata contains two sanctuaries, dedicated to Saleh and possibly Jeremiah. The former is a mosque dedicated to the prophet Saleh (Biblical Shelah), but Saleh's tomb is believed to be in the village of Nabi Salih to the northwest. The latter sanctuary is a cave dedicated to a "Rumia" which according to Charles Simon Clermont-Ganneau, "looks as if it had been connected by the folklore with the name Jeremiah, the initial 'je' being removed by aphaeresis as so frequently happens in Arabic." This signifies that it is very possible that "Rumia" is an Arabicized form of "Jeremiah".

Local administration
Before 1996, 'Anata was governed by a mukhtar. Since then a village council was established to govern the town.

References

Bibliography

External links
Welcome To 'Anata
 Anata
Survey of Western Palestine, Map 17: IAA, Wikimedia commons
'Anata Town (Fact Sheet),   Applied Research Institute–Jerusalem (ARIJ) 
'Anata Town Profile, ARIJ
'Anata aerial photo, ARIJ
Locality Development Priorities and Needs in 'Anata, ARIJ

Villages in the West Bank
Ancient Jewish settlements of Judaea
13 Kohanic cities
Municipalities of the State of Palestine
Anat